The San Antonio River is a river in Peru. It is the principal source that supplies the hydroelectric company of the Rodríguez de Mendoza Province.

Rivers of Peru
Rivers of Amazonas Region